The Girl Who Dared is a 1944 American mystery film directed by Howard Bretherton and written by John K. Butler. The film stars Lorna Gray, Peter Cookson, Grant Withers, Veda Ann Borg, John Hamilton and Willie Best. The film was released on August 5, 1944, by Republic Pictures.

Plot

Cast  
Lorna Gray as Ann Carroll
Peter Cookson as Rufus Blair
Grant Withers as Homer Norton
Veda Ann Borg as Cynthia Harrison / Sylvia Scott
John Hamilton as Beau Richmond
Willie Best as Woodrow
Vivien Oakland as Chattie Richmond
Roy Barcroft as David Scott
Kirk Alyn as Josh Carroll
Kenne Duncan as Dr. Paul Dexter

References

External links 
 

1944 films
American mystery films
1944 mystery films
Republic Pictures films
Films directed by Howard Bretherton
American black-and-white films
1940s English-language films
1940s American films